Lists of fictional presidents of the United States are alphabetical lists of people who have been portrayed in fiction as the president of the United States. Media include novels and short stories, comics, plays, movies and television shows. The roles include fictional presidents, and real historical figures who did not in fact become president, typically in works of alternate history or comedy.

Named fictional presidents
 List of fictional presidents of the United States (A–B)
 List of fictional presidents of the United States (C–D)
 List of fictional presidents of the United States (E–F)
 List of fictional presidents of the United States (G–H)
 List of fictional presidents of the United States (I–J)
 List of fictional presidents of the United States (K–M)
 List of fictional presidents of the United States (N–R)
 List of fictional presidents of the United States (S–T)
 List of fictional presidents of the United States (U–Z)

Historical figures
 List of fictional United States presidencies of historical figures (A–B)
 List of fictional United States presidencies of historical figures (C–D)
 List of fictional United States presidencies of historical figures (E–G)
 List of fictional United States presidencies of historical figures (H–J)
 List of fictional United States presidencies of historical figures (K–L)
 List of fictional United States presidencies of historical figures (M–O)
 List of fictional United States presidencies of historical figures (P–R)
 List of fictional United States presidencies of historical figures (S–U)
 List of fictional United States presidencies of historical figures (V–Z)

See also 
 Alternate Presidents
 African-American presidents of the United States in popular culture
 Female president of the United States in popular culture
 List of actors who played the president of the United States
 Fictional presidents of the Confederate States of America

External links 
 
 Science Fiction's Presidents of the 21st Century 
 

Lists